Eleusis is a genus of unmargined rove beetles in the family Staphylinidae. There are about 10 described species in Eleusis.

Species
These 10 species belong to the genus Eleusis:
 Eleusis angusticeps Bernhauer, 1926 g
 Eleusis apicipennis (Fairmaire, 1849) g
 Eleusis divergens Bernhauer, 1926 g
 Eleusis humilis Erichson, 1840 i c g
 Eleusis pacifica Cameron, 1933 g
 Eleusis pallida LeConte, 1863 i c g b
 Eleusis pallidipennis (Fauvel, 1864) g
 Eleusis raoultii (Fairmaire, 1880) g
 Eleusis schedli Scheerpeltz, 1956 g
 Eleusis terminata Fauvel, 1869 g
Data sources: i = ITIS, c = Catalogue of Life, g = GBIF, b = Bugguide.net

References

Further reading

External links

 

Osoriinae
Articles created by Qbugbot